John Trenchard is the name of:

 John Trenchard (Secretary of State) (1640–1695)
 John Trenchard (writer) (1662–1723)
 John Trenchard (of Warmwell) (c.1596–1662), MP for Wareham and Dorset